Hallam FM is an Independent Local Radio station based in Sheffield, England, owned and operated by Bauer as part of the Hits Radio network. It broadcasts to South Yorkshire.

As of December 2022, the station has a weekly audience of 251,000 listeners according to RAJAR.

History

The station started broadcasting on 1548 kHz/194m AM, 95.2 and 95.9 MHz FM under the name of Radio Hallam from its studios at Hartshead in Sheffield City Centre on 1 October 1974. The first presenter heard on air was ex-BBC Radio 1 DJ Johnny Moran - the first record he played was I've Got the Music in Me by Kiki Dee, which stuck after a minute and a half.

On 1 October 1985, Radio Hallam's broadcast area significantly increased when it began to broadcast to all of South Yorkshire. In 1987, Radio Hallam merged with neighbouring Yorkshire stations Pennine Radio in Bradford and Viking Radio in Hull to form the now-defunct Yorkshire Radio Network.

The frequencies were changed during the 1980s to 96.1 FM for Rotherham, 97.4 FM for Sheffield, 102.9 FM for Barnsley, and 103.4 for the remainder of South Yorkshire. After a take-over of the parent company YRN by the Metro Radio Group, the AM frequency became Great Yorkshire Gold. As part of Hallam's licence agreement, the Rotherham transmitter ceased to be used by the station in the 1990s. Hallam also moved its studio facilities to 900 Herries Road, close to Sheffield Wednesday's Hillsborough ground. The office space at Hartshead was formerly used by the Sheffield Star newspaper.

As the Metro Radio Group was bought by EMAP, Hallam FM also became part of the Big City Network in Northern England. In 2011, Bauer Media's Big City Network was replaced by the Place Portfolio, containing the group's local radio stations.

As of October 2019, Hallam FM's Sheffield studios are shared with sister Yorkshire station Viking FM, following the closure of Viking's studios in Hull.

Broadcasting
Hallam FM's main competitors are BBC Radio 1, Capital Yorkshire & Heart Yorkshire. Other local competing stations include BBC Radio Sheffield, Greatest Hits Radio North Derbyshire and Greatest Hits Radio Yorkshire.

The station broadcasts on analogue frequencies on 97.4 FM (Tapton Hill, Sheffield), 103.4 FM (Clifton, near the M18) and 102.9 FM (Ardsley) in Sheffield, Doncaster and Barnsley respectively. Almost the whole region is covered on 103.4 FM. The station also broadcasts via DAB on the Bauer Radio multiplex, and online and via their app.

Programming
Networked programming originates from Bauer's Manchester studios.

The station's flagship breakfast show, Big John @ Breakfast, is produced and broadcast from Bauer's Sheffield studios, weekdays from 6-10am.

News
Bauer's Sheffield newsroom broadcasts local news bulletins hourly from 6am-7pm on weekdays, and from 7am-1pm on Saturdays and Sundays. Headlines are broadcast on the half-hour during weekday breakfast and drivetime shows, alongside traffic bulletins.

National bulletins from Sky News Radio are carried overnight with bespoke networked bulletins on weekend afternoons, usually originating from Bauer's Leeds newsroom.

Notable past presenters

 Steve Banyard
 Tom Binns
 Jon Culshaw
 Daryl Denham (now at BBC Radio Kent)
 Stephanie Hirst (now at Hits Radio)
 Keith Skues
 Cindy Kent (now at Serenade Radio)
 Stuart Linnell (now at Serenade Radio)
 Scottie McClue (now at Nation Radio Scotland)  
 Chris Rogers
 Matthew Rudd (now at Absolute 80s)

References

External links

 Hallam FM
 History of local radio in Yorkshire
 Clifton transmitter
 Tapton Hill/Crosspool transmitter

Radio stations established in 1974
Bauer Radio
Hits Radio
Mass media in Sheffield
Radio stations in Yorkshire